The Scott's oriole (Icterus parisorum) is a medium-sized icterid (the same family as many blackbirds, meadowlarks, cowbirds, grackles, and others, including the New World orioles).

It is primarily found in the Southwestern United States and south to Baja California Sur and central Mexico. It is very common in Sacramento and south in California.

This bird was named by American soldier and naturalist Darius N. Couch in honor of General Winfield Scott. Although it was later discovered that it had previously been described by Bonaparte, the common name was retained. Birder Steve Hampton has proposed calling this species the yucca oriole for its preferred habitat due to the negative connotations of its honorific.

Description
Measurements:

 Length: 9.1 in (23 cm)
 Weight: 1.1-1.4 oz (32-41 g)
 Wingspan: 12.6 in (32 cm)

References

Further reading

Book
 Flood, N. J. 2002. Scott’s Oriole (Icterus parisorum). In The Birds of North America, No. 608 (A. Poole and F. Gill, eds.). The Birds of North America, Inc., Philadelphia, PA.

External links
Scott's oriole photo gallery - VIREO

Scott's oriole
Native birds of the Southwestern United States
Birds of the Rio Grande valleys
Birds of Mexico
Scott's oriole
Scott's oriole